Prosartes smithii is a North American species of flowering plants known by the common name largeflower fairybells. It is native to western North America from Vancouver Island in British Columbia south as far as Monterey County in California. It grows in shady forest and woodland, including redwood forests.

The inflorescence produces up to seven drooping, hanging flowers which may be hidden in the cover of the large leaves.

References

External links
USDA Plants Profile
Calphotos Photo gallery, University of California

smithii
Flora of the West Coast of the United States
Plants described in 1838
Flora without expected TNC conservation status